San Antonio District may refer to:

In the United States:
 San Antonio, Oakland, California

In Costa Rica:
 San Antonio District, Alajuela (in Alajuela (canton), Alajuela province)
 San Antonio District, Alajuelita (in Alajuelita (canton), San José province)
 San Antonio District, Belén (in Belén (canton), Heredia province)
 San Antonio District, Desamparados (in Desamparados (canton), San José province)
 San Antonio District, Escazú (in Escazú (canton), San José province)
 San Antonio District, León Cortés (in León Cortés (canton), San José province)
 San Antonio District, Nicoya (in Nicoya (canton), Guanacaste province)
 San Antonio District, Puriscal (in Puriscal (canton), San José province)

In Peru:
 San Antonio District, Cañete
 San Antonio District, Huarochirí